Black Uhuru is a Jamaican reggae group formed in 1972, initially as Uhuru (Swahili for 'freedom'). The group has undergone several line-up changes over the years, with Derrick "Duckie" Simpson as the mainstay. They had their most successful period in the 1980s, with their album Anthem winning the first ever Grammy Award for Best Reggae Album in 1985.

History
The group formed in the Waterhouse district of Kingston in 1972, initially called “Uhuru" (the Swahili word for freedom), with a line-up of Garth Dennis, Don Carlos, and Derrick "Duckie" Simpson. Their first release was a cover version of The Impressions' "Romancing to the Folk Song", which was followed by "Time is on Our Side"; Neither song was a success and they split up, with Carlos pursuing a solo career, as did Dennis, before joining The Wailing Souls. Simpson also briefly worked with the Wailing Souls, before forming a new version of Uhuru with Errol Nelson (of The Jayes) and Michael Rose, the group now taking the name Black Sounds Uhuru. Their Prince Jammy-produced debut album, Love Crisis, was released in 1977.

Nelson returned to The Jayes in late 1977, and was replaced the following year by Sandra "Puma" Jones, a social worker from South Carolina, US, who had previously worked as a dancer for Ras Michael & the Sons of Negus, and as a member of the group Mama Africa. The band now took on their most familiar name, Black Uhuru. The group began working extensively with Sly and Robbie, and recorded a string of successful singles, including "General Penitentiary" a re-recording of Rose's solo hit "Guess Who's Coming to Dinner", and "Shine Eye Gal", which featured guest guitarist Keith Richards. The group's second album Showcase drew on these singles, and the band cemented their status with a performance at the 1980 Reggae Sunsplash festival. They planned to record an album with Dennis Brown producing, but this didn't materialise, although two singles, "Wood for My Fire" and "Rent Man", were released. They were signed by Island Records in 1980, who issued the Sinsemilla album to an international audience in 1981. The follow-up, Red reached number 28 in the UK Albums Chart in 1981, Chill Out reached number 38 a year later, and they toured with The Rolling Stones. In 1989, their album Red was ranked No. 23 on Rolling Stone magazine's list of the "100 greatest albums of the 1980s." Their next studio album, Anthem, appeared in 1984, and won the first ever Grammy Award for Best Reggae Album the following year.

Despite this success, Rose left the group in 1984 to resume his solo career after falling out with Simpson, and was replaced by Junior Reid. They signed to RAS Records and moved in a different direction with the album Brutal and the single "The Great Train Robbery", the latter recorded with New York dance producer Arthur Baker. Although these alienated much of their roots reggae following, Brutal was nominated for a Grammy and "The Great Train Robbery" gave them their second UK hit single, reaching number 62. The band began to disintegrate; their next album with Jammy was started but never completed, they stopped working with Sly and Robbie, and Jones left the band due to ill health (she died in 1990 from cancer). Her replacement was Janet "Olafunke" Reid, and the group returned in 1987 with the Positive album. Reid was unable to obtain a US visa, and unable to tour, left the band, followed shortly by Olafunke.

Black Uhuru, now reduced to Simpson alone, had been booked to play at an awards ceremony in California, which coincidentally had original Uhuru members Don Carlos and Garth Dennis on the bill, and they took the opportunity to reunite the original line-up for a performance at the event, and decided to continue afterwards. The Now album followed in 1991, and was also nominated for a Grammy. In 1996 the group fragmented again, with Simpson leaving to tour Europe with dub poet Yasus Afari, under the name Black Uhuru, while Carlos and Dennis also toured the US under the same name. A legal battle over the name followed, won by Simpson in 1997. Carlos resumed his solo career, while Simpson formed a new line-up of Black Uhuru with Andrew Bees and Jennifer Connally. Only two albums, Unification and Dynasty, were released before Bees went back to pursue his solo career in 2003.

In February 2004, it was announced in the Jamaican press that Simpson and Michael Rose had reunited under the name "Black Uhuru feat. Michael Rose". Together with a female backing singer named Kay Starr, they released a single, "Dollars", and performed at several concerts including "Western Consciousness 2004" on 28 April in Jamaica, of which a live video was released shortly thereafter. A new album was reported to be in progress, although it was never released. The group toured throughout Europe in 2006.

In 2008, Simpson took on lead vocal duties, and in 2012 the group recorded a new album, As the World Turns, with guest appearances from Aterciopelados and Jarabe De Palo, although this was still unreleased a year later due to the master files getting corrupted. A 25th Anniversary Edition DVD of their Live in London concert was released in June 2008. In 2011, the group now featuring Derrick "Duckie" Simpson, Andrew Bees, and Kaye Starr, toured the US for the first time since 2002. In 2014 Jojo Mac joined the group, and left in 2016 to continue her solo career. The band re-recorded all but one track of As the World Turns, which was eventually released in September 2018.

In 2012  Black Uhuru was honored with the Lifetime Achievement Award in Music by the City of Las Vegas and was handed the KEY TO THE CITY. Alongside that Award, August 31st was of officially named Black Uhuru Day in Las Vegas.

Black Uhuru undertook a US tour in 2016 with Andrew Bees on lead vocals and Elsa Green on backing vocals. Singer Onesty opened for the band.

Selected album discography 

1980 – Sinsemilla
1981 – Red
1982 – Chill Out
1983 – Guess Who's Coming to Dinner (Black Uhuru re-edition)
1983 – Anthem
1986 – Brutal
1987 – Positive
1990 – Now
1991 – Iron Storm
1993 – Mystical Truth
1994 – Strongg
2018 – As the World Turns

Awards and nominations 
Black Uhuru has won one Grammy award and were nominated eight times.

|-
|align=center|1982
|Reggae Sunsplash '81, A Tribute To Bob Marley
|Best Ethnic or Traditional Folk  Recording
|
|-
|align=center|1984
|Anthem
| rowspan="3" |Best Reggae Recording
|
|-
|align=center|1986
|Brutal
|
|-
|align=center|1990
|Now
|
|-
|align=center|1991
|Iron Storm
| rowspan="4" |Best Reggae Album
|
|-
|align=center|1993
|Mystical Truth
|
|-
|align=center|1994
|Strongg
|
|-
|align=center|2018
|As the World Turns
|
|-

Notes

References
Campbell, Howard (2004) "Michael Rose returns to Black Uhuru", Jamaica Observer, 4 February 2004, retrieved 26 September 2009.
Campbell, Howard (2008) " Duckie sings lead", Jamaica Gleaner, 9 September 2008, retrieved 26 September 2009.
Harris, Craig "[ Black Uhuru Biography]", AllMusic, Macrovision Corporation.
Thompson, Dave (2002), Reggae and Caribbean Music, Backbeat Books,

External links
 Black Uhuru on Discogs
 
 Black Uhuru on Myspace

Jamaican reggae musical groups
Musical groups established in 1972
Grammy Award winners
Island Records artists
ROIR artists
Palm Pictures artists